InnerCity Weightlifting (ICW) is a 501(c) non-profit organization founded in Boston, Massachusetts. The organization originated as a gym with the simple goal of keeping "at-risk" youth off the streets, but has since evolved into a community and support network as well as a source of education, job-training, and employment in personal training for young people who have been imprisoned and/or connected to street gangs.

ICW's unique solution to the nationwide problem of gang-related violence focuses on working with the young people characterized as the highest risk population in Boston for violence. ICW's goal is to empower its students and give them the connections and tools to say "no" to violence, and "yes" to opportunity.

History 
InnerCity Weightlifting was founded in 2010 by Jon Feinman, as an after-school program for at risk youth. It began with four students and has since grown to serve over 150 young people. These youth, who are generally men under 24 make up the "one percent of the population who commit 70 percent of the violent crimes." Feinman, who has a background in Olympic weightlifting and personal training says, "..weightlifting is just the hook to get students in the door." Once inside the gym, students are able to work on obtaining GEDs, personal training certifications, and making connections with positive adults.

In 2015, ICW expanded into a second location in Kendall Square, Cambridge where the focus is on providing students with ample training clients to improve their economic mobility.  ICW's second location is designed as a fitness studio where its most devoted student trainers earn a living by training several clients a week, and traveling to nearby offices for corporate workout sessions.

In the future, InnerCity Weightlifting hopes to go national. "Our overall vision is to create a systematic change in terms of the ways that society views these young people," Feinman says.

Programs and services 
InnerCity Weightlifting provides its students with a gym that acts as an oasis and safe haven. In addition, ICW offers numerous services, and connects it students to organizations that can help its students acquire the tools they need to thrive. Some of the services provided and located by ICW are:
 Educational services such as GED tutoring
 Finding safe affordable housing
 Job placement and training

Impact 
Innercity Weightlifting has engaged with 150 "high risk students" and has seen a 78% reduction in student trainer arrests after joining ICW. Many students of ICW have celebrated record periods out of prison. Some student trainers have completely turned their lives around, finding opportunity in a life that before seemed inevitably headed towards jail, or death. In addition, 90 percent of ICW students report an increased feeling of hope.

Personal training 
InnerCity Weightlifting uses personal training as a tool to teach patience, discipline, and hard work. In addition, ICW offers an apprenticeship program that primes its most dedicated students for a career in personal training.  ICW opened a second location in Kendall Square, Cambridge in 2015 with the goal of improving the economic and social mobility of its student trainers. In Kendall Square, student trainers are able to take on clients, and travel to nearby offices to train corporate employees, who generally come from radically different backgrounds.

Media and recognition 
InnerCity Weightlifting has been featured in articles from The Huffington Post, The Boston Globe, Boston Magazine, and has been featured in video segments of the CBS Evening News, ESPN's SportsCenter, New England Sports Network, and ABC News.

Additionally, ICW has received various local and national awards from the Boston Celtics, Babson College, Year Up, Good Sports, Cabot Creamery, and Anytime Fitness. Founder Jon Feinman was named one of the Greater Boston Chamber of Commerce 2014 Ten Outstanding Young Leaders, and was named a 2012 Social Innovator by Social Innovation Forum, Ernst & Young Social Entrepreneur of the Year; ICW won the 19th annual Rosoff Award for workplace diversity.

References

External links 
 InnerCity Weightlifting

Non-profit organizations based in Boston
Weightlifting